Bejjeh SC is a Lebanese sports club most known for its basketball program. It is located in Byblos, Lebanon, with further branches. Bejjeh SC was established at the heights of the 2012-13 Lebanese basketball season and was part of the Lebanese Basketball League playing in division A. in the 2013-14 season as a result of falling last in the standings, Bejjeh was brought down from Division A to the Division 1 basketball league.

Squad

External links

Basketball teams in Lebanon
Basketball teams established in 1966
1966 establishments in Lebanon
Byblos